Monrovia Club Breweries is an association football club based in Monrovia, Liberia.

History
Their home Stadium is the Antonette Tubman Stadium. They have never won the Liberian Premier League (LPL) in their History. The club is named after the sponsorship Monrovia Breweries organizations.

Achievements
Liberian Cup: 3
 1994, 2016, 2021.

Liberian Super Cup: 1
 2016.

Current squad

Notes

 
Football clubs in Liberia
Sport in Monrovia